is a Japanese voice actress and singer from Osaka Prefecture.

Personal life
On 30 August 2017, she announced her marriage and first baby. In 2020, she announced her second baby.

Filmography

Television animation
2005
 Shuffle!, Schoolgirl A
 Major First Season, Classmate
 Major Second Season, Student

2006
 Shiroi Koibito, Kai
 MegaMan NT Warrior BEAST+, High school girl B, Child

2007
 Ah! My Goddess: Fighting Wings, Valkyrie
 Over Drive, Student
 Kirarin Revolution, Girl
 Gin Tama, Woman
 Sumomomo Momomo, Girl A
 Zero Duel Masters, Duellist
 D.Gray-man, Lady B
 Hatara Kizzu Maihamu Gumi, Memi
 Love Com, Akechin, Student
 Mega Man Star Force, Child

2008
 Gin Tama, Woman A, Ginko
 Monochrome Factor, Woman

2009
 Umineko no Naku Koro ni, Leviathan
 K-On!, Ui Hirasawa
 Gokujō!! Mecha Mote Iinchō, Kaho Harui
 The Sacred Blacksmith, Chairperson

2010
 Betrayal Knows My Name, Ai, Schoolgirl A
 Maid Sama!, Woman customer
 K-On!!, Ui Hirasawa
 Strike Witches 2, Maria
 Nodame Cantabile: Finale, Mika
 Pokémon: Diamond and Pearl, Urara's Minun
 Ladies versus Butlers!, Schoolgirl

2011
 Gin Tama, Sachiko
 Pretty Rhythm: Aurora Dream, Serena Jōnouchi

2012
 Another, Izumi Akazawa
 Daily Lives of High School Boys, Yukana
 Pretty Rhythm: Dear My Future, Jae-eun
 Seitokai no Ichizon Lv.2, Ringo Sugisaki

2013
 RDG Red Data Girl, Mayura Sōda
 Stella Women's Academy, High School Division Class C3, Yachiyo Hinata
 Genshiken 2, Kumiko Yabusaki
 White Album 2, Setsuna Ogiso

2014
 A Good Librarian Like a Good Shepherd, Tsugumi Shirasaki
 Girl Friend Beta, Hina Nigaki

2015
 Shirobako, Sara Satou, Ayano Makise, Christine Waldegård
 Magical Girl Lyrical Nanoha ViVid, Olivie Sägebrecht

2016
Aokana: Four Rhythm Across the Blue, Rika Ichinose

2017
In Another World With My Smartphone, Cecile

2019
Star Twinkle PreCure, Leo's Star Princess
The Case Files of Lord El-Melloi II: Rail Zeppelin Grace Note, Olga Marie Animusphere

2021
Muteking the Dancing Hero, An

Original video animation (OVA)
 Isekai no Seikishi Monogatari, Lashara Earth XXVIII
 Gift: Eternal Rainbow, Companion
 T.P.Sakura: Time Paladin Sakura, Moe Mizukoshi
 Futari Ecchi, Waitress B
 Shirobako, Christine Waldegård

Films
 Pokémon: Arceus and the Jewel of Life (2009), Nidoran♀
 K-On! the Movie (2011), Ui Hirasawa
 Girls und Panzer der Film (2015), Tamaki Tamada
 Fate/Grand Order: First Order (2016), Olga Marie Animusphere
 Girls und Panzer das Finale (2017), Flint

Video games
 Genkai Tokki: Seven Pirates, Sakyura
 K-On! Hōkago Live!!, Ui Hirasawa
 Touhou Genso Wanderer, Sanae Kochiya
 Granblue Fantasy, Ferry
 White Album 2, Setsuna Ogiso
 Dragalia Lost , Odetta
 Fate/Grand Order , U-Olga Marie

References

External links
  
 

1982 births
Living people
Voice actresses from Osaka Prefecture
Japanese video game actresses
Japanese voice actresses
81 Produce voice actors
21st-century Japanese women singers
21st-century Japanese singers